Lober may refer to:

Lober (Mulde), a river of Saxony and Saxony-Anhalt, Germany, tributary of the Mulde

People with the surname Lober
Georg J. Lober (1891–1961), American sculptor
John Lober (born 1968), mixed martial artist
Rick Lober, keyboardist of the 1960s Detroit rock band The Amboy Dukes